Eccremocarpus is a genus of five species of flowering plants in the family Bignoniaceae, native to western South America in Chile, western Argentina, and Peru. The species are evergreen semi-woody vines growing to 1–7 m tall.

It is also in Tribe Tourrettieae.

Selected species
 Eccremocarpus longiflorus Humb. & Bonpl. Peru.
 Eccremocarpus scaber Ruiz & Pav. (Chilean glory flower) Chile, western Argentina.
 Eccremocarpus vargasianus Sandwith. Peru.

Cultivation and uses
Eccremocarpus scaber is grown as an ornamental plant for its attractive tubular flowers. In cool temperate regions it is not winter hardy, and is often grown as an annual plant.

References

Bignoniaceae
Bignoniaceae genera